A by-election was held for the New South Wales Legislative Assembly electorate of Leichhardt on 9 July 1954 because of the death of Claude Matthews who committed suicide while still in office. He had been receiving treatment for a "nervous condition" for 18 months.

Dates

Result

 Preferences were not distributed.Claude Matthews died.

See also
Electoral results for the district of Leichhardt (New South Wales)
List of New South Wales state by-elections

References

New South Wales state by-elections
1954 elections in Australia
1950s in New South Wales